Eupithecia versiplaga is a moth in the family Geometridae. It is found in Peru.

The forewings are chalk-white and the markings are black. The hindwings are dull grey, with traces of darker cross-lines.

References

Moths described in 1905
versiplaga
Moths of South America